Capital North East is a regional radio station owned and operated by Global as part of the Capital network. It broadcasts to North East England from studios in Newcastle upon Tyne.

The station launched on 1 June 1999 as Galaxy 105–106, renamed in 2006 as Galaxy North East and rebranded on 3 January 2011 as Capital North East.

History

Galaxy North East
Originally called Galaxy 105–106, presenter Steve Furnell launched the station on 1 June 1999with "What You Need", by Powerhouse, being the first record played.

The name was changed to Galaxy North East in 2006, in line with other Galaxy stations. This year also saw a change in demographic from 15–29 to 15–34 and a new strapline of "Passion for Music, Passion for Life". Two years later, the slogan was changed  to "Love Music". In 2008, they also changed their output format to include a more mainstream playlist. During late 2010, the slogan changed to The North East's No.1 Hit Music Station.

Networked programming was broadcast from Galaxy Yorkshire in Leeds.

Capital North East
The station was rebranded as 105–106 Capital FM on 3 January 2011, as part of a merger of Global's Galaxy and Hit Music networks to form the nine-stations of Capital. Steve Furnell and Karen Wight remained on breakfast with Roger 'Bodg' Howard on drive time.

Kim Miljus was appointed managing director of Capital North East, replacing Matt Bashford, she was the former station director of Metro Radio. Giles Eyre-Tanner became the station's programme controller on 5 October 2011, replacing Stuart Barrie.

Long-serving Capital Breakfast presenters Steve Furnell and Karen Wight left Capital North East to join rival station Metro Radio. Capital Drivetime presenter Roger "Bodg" Howard, producer Matt Bailey and Take Me Out contestant JoJo Hatfield took over from the duo on 3 January 2012. 2010 Student Radio Awards winner Rob Howard joined the station and presented Capital Drivetime for three years. From 30 November 2015 Gogglebox star Scarlett Moffatt replaced Hatfield for a year. On 19 June 2017, former Miss Newcastle winner Hannah Gray took over from Moffatt.

In May 2015, Capital North East moved to new studios at new studios at Wellbar Central in Newcastle city centre, shared with sister station Heart North East and Communicorp-owned Smooth North East.

On 26 February 2019, Global stated the station's local Capital Breakfast and weekend shows would be replaced with networked programming from 8 April 2019. The weekday local Capital Drivetime show was retained, alongside news bulletins, traffic updates and advertising. "Bodg", Matt Bailey and Hannah Gray left the station whilst Martin Lowes remains.

Transmission

Programming
All networked programming originates from Global's London headquarters, including Capital Breakfast with Roman Kemp.

Local programming is produced and broadcast from Global's Newcastle studios from 4-7pm on weekdays, presented by Sam Lavery.

News
Global's Newsroom broadcasts hourly regional news updates from 6am-7pm on weekdays and 6am-12pm at weekends with headlines on the hour during Capital Breakfast on weekdays. The Newcastle newsroom also produces regional news bulletins for Heart North East and Smooth North East.

Notable former presenters

 Sacha Brooks 
 Rich Clarke 
 Charlotte Crosby
 David Dunne
 Andi Durrant
 Stephanie Hirst 
 Greg James 

 Dave Kelly 
 Scarlett Moffatt
 Adele Roberts 
 Steve Sutherland
 Margherita Taylor 
 Tiësto
 Neil 'Roberto' Williams

References

External links
 
 History of local radio in Tyne and Wear.

North East
Radio stations in North East England
Radio stations established in 1999
Mass media in Newcastle upon Tyne
1999 establishments in England